Villegailhenc-Aragon XIII are a semi-professional rugby league team based in Villegailhenc, Aude in Languedoc-Rousillon in southern France. They currently play in the second tier competition the Elite Two Championship. Their home stadium is the Stade Jerome Rieux.

History
Originally being an amateur club they competed in the French rugby league amateur competition the Federal Championship. In 1987 they reached their first 'Federal Championship' final, now called National Division 2, but lost out to Le Barcares 9-16. In 1993 they once again reached the final but lost again this time to Le Lauquet-Palaja 15-18. By the first decade of the millennium they were still  playing in the National Division 2 but that changed when in season 2011/12 they once again reached the final but this time they won beating Le Soler 11-6 and thus clinching promotion. The next two seasons brought success in the Paul Dejean Cup then in season 2014/15 they won through to the National Division 1 play-off final and despite losing to US Ferrals XIII they were promoted to the 2nd tier for the very first time, they struggled at the higher level and finished the season bottom with no wins, but they escaped relegation when the top two tier leagues were increased. They also became top flight club AS Carcassonne's official feeder team.

Current squad
20121-22 Squad;
Mohand Ait Ouaret
Loic Banquet
Maxime Banquet
Nicolas Bertolas
Enzo Chaumond
Gregory Delarose
Anthony Delgado
Alex Durou
Robin Escanuela
 Djamel Remok
 Clement Cartier
Antonine Gau
Douglas Gauvin
Thomas Limongi
Saia Makisi
Yann Marchio
Valentin Marot
Alexandre Mickalezyk
Victor Monclus
Denis Montero
Quentin Nicol
Tyrone Pau
Maxime Peault
Romain Peault
Tely Pelo
Dorian Percheron
Nicolas Puyal
Ludovic Renu
Benjamin Tiquet
Kevin Tisseyre

Honours
 Elite Two Championship (1): 2017-18
 National Division 2 (1): 2011-12
 Paul Dejean Cup (2): 2013,2014

References

External links

French rugby league teams
Sport in Aude